The 2012 America East men's lacrosse tournament was the 13 edition of the America East Conference men's lacrosse tournament and took place from May 2 to May 5 at the higher seeds home field. The winner of the tournament received the America East Conference's automatic bid to the 2012 NCAA Division I Men's Lacrosse Championship. Four teams from the America East conference will compete in the single elimination tournament. The seeds were based upon the teams' regular season conference record.

Standings

Only the top four teams in the America East conference advanced to the America East Conference Tournament.

Schedule

Bracket

 denotes an overtime game

All-Tournament
Sean Brady, Stony Brook	

Travis Lyons, Albany

Jeff Tundo, Stony Brook	

Tate Kildonas, Hartford

Kyle Moeller, Stony Brook
	
Ben Knapton, Hartford

JJ Laforet, Stony Brook
	
Scott Jones, UMBC

Phil Poe, UMBC

Joe Resetarits, Albany
	
Lyle Thompson, Albany

Most Outstanding Player

Sean Brady, Stony Brook

References 

 Retrieved 2015-05-10

2012 Men's Lacrosse Championship Central Retrieved 2015-05-10

 Retrieved 2015-05-10

Stony Brook Tops Albany for Men's Lacrosse Title Retrieved 2015-05-10

External links
2012 Men's Lacrosse Championship Central

2012 in lacrosse